Dactylorhiza elata, the robust marsh orchid, is a species of flowering plant in the family Orchidaceae, native to the western Mediterranean region (France (including Corsica), Sardinia, Spain, Portugal, Algeria, Morocco and Tunisia).

This plant has gained the Royal Horticultural Society's Award of Garden Merit (confirmed 2017).

Subspecies
Many names have been proposed for subspecies, varieties, subvarieties and forms of the species. As of June 2014, the following are recognized:

Dactylorhiza elata subsp. elata - Spain, North Africa
Dactylorhiza elata subsp. sesquipedalis (Willd.) Soó - France, Spain, Portugal, Sardinia

References

External links

Dave's Garden, PlantFiles: Species Orchid, Robust Marsh Orchid, Stately Dactylorhiza Dactylorhiza elata
Alpine Garden Society Plant Encyclopedia
Orquídeas Ibericas, Dactylorhiza elata
First Nature, Dactylorhiza elata
Numericable, Dactylorhiza elata subsp. sesquipedalis
Tela Botanica, Dactylorhize des Charentes, Dactylorhiza elata subsp. sesquipedalis
Orquídeas de Almería, Dactylorhiza elata (Poiret) Soó
Miradas Cantábricas, Dactylorhiza elata 

elata
Orchids of Europe
Orchids of Africa
Flora of North Africa
Plants described in 1789